The Fionavar Tapestry is a trilogy of fantasy novels by Canadian author Guy Gavriel Kay, published between 1984 and 1986. The novels are partly set in our own contemporary world, but mostly in the fictional world of Fionavar. It is the story of five University of Toronto senior law and medical students, who are drawn into the 'first world of the Tapestry' by the mage Loren Silvercloak. Once there, each discovers his or her own role and destiny in the framework of an epic conflict.

Books in the series
The three books are:
The Summer Tree
The Wandering Fire
The Darkest Road

Ysabel, while not part of The Fionavar Tapestry proper, features two of the same characters and often refers to the events of the trilogy.

Characters

The Five
Drawn by magic from our world and thus strangers to Fionavar, each of five University of Toronto students finds a new role and a new destiny during their adventures in Fionavar.

 Kevin Laine (Liadon) – Witty, bright, outgoing. Fair of hair and of spirit. The act of love has a strangely deep and intense effect on him.
 Paul Schafer (Pwyll Twiceborn) – Highly intelligent, withdrawn. He is haunted by the death of his girlfriend in a car accident that he believes was his fault.
 Dave Martyniuk (Davor) – A large star basketball player, he carries emotional scars from his Eastern European immigrant father's rough treatment of him as a child and has difficulty accepting or offering friendship.
 Kimberly Ford (The Seer) –  Quiet, intelligent and sensitive, but with the strength to make difficult choices and do what must be done.
 Jennifer Lowell (Guinevere) –  Green eyed, beautiful but cool and reserved. Former lover of Kevin's, still good friends.

Arthurian characters
A main thread of the story is the replaying of the legends of King Arthur, Lancelot and Guinevere, all of whom appear in the story. Arthur is brought into Fionavar as The Warrior by Kimberley; Lancelot is revived in Cader Sedat in the second book, and Guinevere's life and memories awaken within Jennifer; the three reenact some (though not all) of their well-known tale as expiation for their sins.

The Deities
The Weaver – the Creator of the Tapestry, the fabric of time, causality and existence, and all the worlds within it. He is said to dwell in a domain called the Weaver's Halls, where the souls of mortals go after death (similar to the Halls of Mandos in Tolkien's legendarium). The inhabitants of Fionavar believe the Weaver to be a "hands-off" deity, who acts only to bring about events required by fate (the "weave of the Tapestry") and who otherwise does not interfere with free will; the Weaver's only pronounced law is that the gods cannot act directly upon the Tapestry (most especially to directly battle the powers of the Dark) without being summoned and bound by mortals to do so, an act that always requires sacrifice. The gods can, however, act indirectly by choosing mortal champions and bestowing gifts and powers upon them. Should any god break this stricture and act to directly interfere, the other gods ensure a price is always paid.
Mörnir – Lord of the Summer Tree, the patron god of the royal house of the High Kingdom of Brennin. His role seems to be a sky-god who is connected with ravens and oak trees, somewhat like a combination of Odin and Thor in classical mythology. Giver of the "sky-lore", the power of wizardly magic wielded by the mages of Brennin.
Dana – Goddess of the earth and the Moon, the "mother, sister, daughter, bride of the God". An earthmother deity worshipped by the Priestesses of Gwen Ystrat, the ruler of blood magic and the avarlith, the power derived from the earth. Her name is directly inspired by the Irish goddess Danu.
Ceinwen – the Huntress, a goddess of the wood and the hunt, revered by the Dalrei, a tribal people of the plains of Fionavar. Like Artemis, she slays all men of Fionavar who are unlucky enough to witness her hunting.
Cernan of the Beasts – god of animals and wild things, also revered by the Dalrei. Like Herne the Hunter, he is crowned with the antlers of a stag. His name is derived from the Celtic deity Cernunnos.
Macha and Nemain – twin goddesses of war, directly inspired by the Irish mythological figures associated with The Morrigan.
Liranan – god of the sea, his name is derived from the Celtic deity Manannan mac Lir.
Owein and the Wild Hunt – A group of once-mortal kings who together comprise an essential cosmic force of randomness and wildness; their existence is held to be necessary for mortals to have free will. Normally bound to sleep within the Cave of the Sleepers, they can be woken and summoned by the artifact Owein's Horn, but must be led by a mortal child who becomes one of them and rides with them. Inspired by the Wild Hunt of European folklore. 
Rakoth Maugrim, the Unraveller, Sathain, The Hooded One – renegade god, the enemy of the Weaver and of all that is good.  Jealous of the Weaver's creation, he broke into Fionavar just as the Weaver had completed his work, bringing fear, pain, distress, and great evil.  Since he came from outside the Weaver's Loom, he has no thread in the Tapestry and so cannot be destroyed.  A thousand years ago the combined might of all the races of Fionavar came against him and, after a final tremendous battle they defeated him and chained him beneath the mountain Rangat.  His escape sets in motion the events of the trilogy.
Galadan – Lord of the Andain (offspring of a mating between god and mortal), a shapechanger who can take the form of a malevolent black wolf with a silver splash on its head; he works with Maugrim but for his own openly nihilistic ends.
Flidais – Another Andain, who lives in Pendaran Wood; he claims to have lived as the legendary bard Taliesin in our world.
Fordaetha of Ruk – Ice queen of the Barrens in the far north; her touch freezes men to the bone.

Other characters
Darien is son of Jennifer and Rakoth Maugrim, Darien is precisely balanced between Dark and Light. His choice turns out to be the most difficult of all. He is able to take the form of a white owl.
Ailell dan Art is the High King of Brennin.  He has two sons, the elder of whom, Aileron, is in exile.  The younger, Diarmuid, although a fearless and elegant fighter is also (apparently) frivolous, impulsive, and shallow. Diarmuid falls in love with and is eventually betrothed to  Sharra, also known as the Dark Rose of Cathal. Her father is Shalhassan whose title is Supreme Lord of Cathal.
Historically the Council of the Mages, headquartered in Brennin, may include up to seven mages, but at the time of the story there are only three: Loren Silvercloak, and his source Matt Sören, a dwarf; Metran, First Mage, and his source Denbarra; Teyrnon, and his source Barak. Each source is bound to the mage he serves by magical rituals and oaths, and provides from his own lifeforce the energy needed to power the mage's magical works.  This link can be drawn upon even to the source's death, although this will then render the mage permanently powerless. The Book of Nilsom (a grimoire belonging to a mad mage of the past) includes secret knowledge of an abominable method by which a mage may gain power from more than one source. Other important Brennin folk include Ysanne, the Seer of Brennin; Jaelle, High Priestess of Dana at the temple in Brennin; Vae, Shahar, and their son Finn; Mabon, duke of Rhoden, who saves Dave from being killed by Avaia, the carnivorous black swan; and Leila, a 15-year-old who calls Finn to "The Longest Road" via a game called the "takiena" and succeeds Jaelle as High Priestess.
The Dalrei, plains-dwelling tribes of nomadic hunters who both hunt and guard the vast herds of eltor in the northern part of Fionavar.  Each tribe is led its own chieftain, helped by the tribe's shaman who is ritually blinded in youth the better to focus the sight of his inner eye.  Of particular interest to the story is the Third Tribe, under the leadership of Ivor dan Bannor and their shaman, Gereint.  Ivor's wife Leith, and their children Levon, Tabor and Cordeliane also play important parts.
The lios alfar or Light Elves, live in Daniloth, a beautiful land in the northwest corner of the land which they have of necessity wrapped in a confusing mist as protection from Maugrim and others who wish them evil.  Notable lios alfar of the past include Lathen Mistweaver who wove the sheltering mist, and Ra-Termaine, killed by Maugrim at the Bael Rangat.  Present-day light-elves include Brendel, a lord of his people, and Ra-Tenniel, their king.  The lios alfar are Maugrim's bitterest foes, "most hated by the dark, for their name is light" (ST, p. 138).
The dwarves dwell in the mountains near the twin peaks of Banir Lök and Banir Tal.  Fierce fighters, they have recently been led into questionable acts by Kaen and Blöd.
The Men of Eridu, a proud and independent race, have been wiped out by a mysterious poisonous rain.  The only remaining man is Faebur, exiled by his father and thus not present when the deadly rain fell.
The Paraiko, the peaceful giants of the mountains. It was the ancient Paraiko who long ago bound Owein and the Wild Hunt to obey Connla's Horn.  The Paraiko refuse violence even in self-defence; in exchange, they are protected by the curse of the Paraiko, drawn down on whoever sheds their blood.

Creatures
Avaia, a black swan with vicious teeth and an odor of corruption, servant of Maugrim.
Curdardh, "the Eldest," a metamorphosing earth-demon of rock and stone who dwells in and guards Pendaran Wood.
Imraith-Nimphais, a red unicorn capable of flight, a gift of Dana for the war against Maugrim.
Uathach, an "enhanced" urgach who, with Galadan, directs Maugrim's forces in battle
Urgach, large powerful warriors of the dark.
Svart alfar, small, loathsome, dispensable dark creatures that eat men and elves.

Themes
Kay's central concept in the novels is that Fionavar is the first of worlds, particularly in a mythological sense; the sagas and tales of other worlds originate (or culminate) in this most primary of settings. Because of this, what happens in Fionavar ripples into other worlds—thus the victory or defeat of Rakoth Maugrim has not just immediate importance for Fionavar but also implications for our own world.

The story emphasizes over and over the importance of free will, as demonstrated in Jennifer's decisions to keep Darien and later to send Lancelot away, Finn's choice to follow his destiny with Owein and the Wild Hunt, Paul and Kevin's acceptance of the role of sacrifice (though in different ways), Diarmuid's decision to take the final battle with Uathach on himself enabling Arthur to survive the last battle, and of course the vital importance of Darien's ultimate choice of allegiance at the end.  When the Baelrath (the "Warstone"), a ring given Kim by Ysanne which is crafted to call various powers into the battle against the Dark, demands that Kim summon and bind the secret power in the Dwarves' sacred lake of Calor Diman, she refuses for moral reasons.

Another important theme is that of forgiveness: Arthur has long since forgiven Guinevere and Lancelot; Paul must learn to forgive himself for his girlfriend Rachel's death; Galadan at the end is forgiven his evil past and offered a second chance; Darien at the end understands his mother's treatment of him and forgives her; and more.

One of the more prominent themes is that of power, and the price that one pays for it.  Often in the book, the price for power lies with someone else, as witnessed by the sources to the mages; as well as Kim's own summoning power, the price is often paid by whatever or whoever was summoned.

References and similarities

Real world
Stonehenge features in the second book.  The ancient caves of Dun Maura bring to mind the caves of the Oracle at Delphi as well as prehistoric caves such as Lascaux. The association of blood with magic (Kevin/Liadon, the avarlith) has roots that go back hundreds of thousands of years. The Dalrei share many aspects of Native American lifestyle, beliefs and ritual, including being a mobile people without permanent settlements; relying on wild hoof stock for most of their resources; the use of totems, dream quests, shamans; and so on.

Tolkien
Fionavar has many similarities to J. R. R. Tolkien's Middle-earth, and seems to be directly influenced by it (perhaps not surprising, since Kay worked with Christopher Tolkien to edit The Silmarillion and prepare it for publication). The map of Fionavar shows the northwestern part of the continent and its western coasts, bordered by an ocean, like most of the Middle-earth maps drawn by Tolkien, especially of Beleriand. Beyond the western sea lies a place where the Lios Alfar (Elves) go when they want to abandon the world, similar to Tolkien's Valinor. The east of the map is bordered by great mountain masses, where the dwarves live around and under the twin peaks of Banir Tal and Banir Lök, similar to the eastern part of Beleriand with the Ered Luin and the two dwarf mansions built on them. To the north is the mountain mass of Starkadh, dominated by Rangat mountain where Rakoth Maugrim is trapped, reminiscent of Ered Engrin and the Thangorodrim. The Council of Mages in Brennin is noted as having a formal limit of seven members (technically fourteen, including the mages' sources); Tolkien's Heren Istarion, the Order of the Wizards, had five known members. Dalrei have some similarities to the Rohirrim, though they are nomadic and less warlike, with their primary influence being that of North American native tribes rather than plain-based Vikings. Pendaran, a wood of the Lios Alfar that has now become perilous, echoes Mirkwood which, with the return of the Necromancer, becomes dark and sinister.

Myths and legends
The stories incorporate, either directly or indirectly, a number of other myths. The most obvious is that of King Arthur, with Arthur, Lancelot and Guinevere/Jennifer working out their love triangle and atoning for their sins.  Kay uses a lesser-known fragment of the Arthurian cycle, that of the May Babies, as the explanation for Arthur's punishment of repeated rebirth/death in battle against evil.  "[T]he Weaver had marked him down for a long unwinding doom. A cycle of war and expiation under many names, and in many worlds, that redress be made for the children and for love" (WF, p. 40). The grey dog who fights Galadan to protect Paul is recognized by Arthur as Cavall, his faithful companion. Lancelot's encounter with Leyse of the lios alfar, her hopeless love for him and subsequent departure by boat for the lios alfar's home in the West is a retelling of the tale of Lancelot and Elaine of Astolat. When Leyse of the Swan Mark, a member of the lios alfar, gives up her life as a result of her hopeless love for Lancelot, she lies down in a boat and sails away in a clear echo of Tennyson's "The Lady of Shalott," and the story of Elaine.

The powerful oak known as the Summer Tree is similar to Yggdrasil, the World Ash Tree of Norse mythology. Norse elements also appear in Mörnir, who with his twin ravens Thought and Memory (Odin's Huginn and Muninn), and the epithet "of the Thunder," is a combination of Thor/Odin.  The lios alfar (light elves) and svart alfar (dark elves) come from the Scandinavian Álfar.

The Cauldron of Khath Meigol and its powers of resurrection hark back to Welsh mythology's tale of the Cauldron of Annwn, and a number of the deities seem to have Celtic or Welsh roots: Paul is known as Pwyll after his sacrifice, while Macha and Nemain come straight from Irish mythology. The wild boar that attacks Kevin, marking him as Liadon, closely resembles the Twrch Trwyth. Cader Sedat, the island where the renegade mage Metran works his dark magic in The Wandering Fire, is the analogue of Caer Sidi  from the poem Preiddeu Annwfn, a poem that is, in the trilogy, ascribed to Taliesin, one of the names used by Flidais.

The Wild Hunt was a folk myth prevalent in former times across Germany, the Sub-Roman Britain and also Scandinavia. Seeing the Wild Hunt was thought to presage some catastrophe such as war or plague, or at best the death of the one who witnessed it. Mortals getting in the path of or following the Hunt could be kidnapped and brought to the land of the dead. The leader of the hunt varies from place to place; examples are King Arthur in Brittany and Odin in Scandinavia. The fundamental image of the Hunt is usually the same: a group of phantasmal huntsmen in mad pursuit across the skies.

The entrapment of Rakoth Maugrim the Unraveller is similar to one of the Four Great Classical Novels of Chinese literature, The Journey to the West. In the prologue of The Summer Tree, Rakoth Maugrim is bound by five wardstones and imprisoned under Mount Rangat.

Awards 
The Wandering Fire won the 1987 Prix Aurora Award in the English category.
The Wandering Fire won the 1987 Casper Award for best speculative fiction.
The author was nominated for a Mythopoeic Fantasy Award for Adult Literature in 1985 for The Summer Tree.

References

Further reading

External links
 The Fionavar Tapestry at Guy Gavriel Kay's Authorized Website.
 Weaving Legitimacy: Kay's Use of Mythology in The Fionavar Tapestry at Guy Gavriel Kay's Authorized Website.

Fantasy novel trilogies
Modern Arthurian fiction
Novels by Guy Gavriel Kay
High fantasy novels